De'Vondre Campbell (born July 1, 1993) is an American football inside linebacker for the Green Bay Packers of the National Football League (NFL). He played college football at Hutchinson Community College before transferring to Minnesota, and was selected by the Atlanta Falcons in the fourth round of the 2016 NFL Draft. Campbell has also played for the Arizona Cardinals.

College career
After playing at the junior college level for Hutchinson Community College, Campbell played for the Minnesota Golden Gophers from 2013 to 2015. As a sophomore in 2013, he recorded 39 total tackles, three tackles-for-loss, and a forced fumble. In 2014, Campbell recorded 75 total tackles, 6.5 tackles-for-loss, 2.5 sacks, an interception, a pass defended, and three fumble recoveries. In his final collegiate season in 2015, Campbell recorded 92 total tackles, 6.5 tackles-for-loss, four sacks, an interception, three passes defended, and two forced fumbles.

Professional career

Atlanta Falcons

2016

The Atlanta Falcons selected Campbell in the fourth round (115th overall) of the 2016 NFL Draft. He was the second linebacker drafted by the Falcons in 2016, behind LSU's Deion Jones. He was also the 16th overall linebacker drafted in 2016.

On May 5, 2016, the Falcons signed Campbell to a four-year, $2.90 million contract that includes a signing bonus of $565,528.

Throughout training camp, Campbell competed to be a starting outside linebacker against Sean Weatherspoon and Philip Wheeler. Head coach Dan Quinn named Campbell the starting weakside linebacker to begin the regular season, alongside Deion Jones and Vic Beasley.

Campbell made his professional regular season debut and first career start in the season-opener against the Tampa Bay Buccaneers and recorded four solo tackles in the 31–24 loss. On September 16, 2016, it was reported that Campbell had sustained an ankle injury during practice. His ankle injury sidelined him for the next four games (Weeks 2–5). On October 23, 2016, Campbell collected a season-high ten combined tackles (six solo) during a 33–30 overtime loss to the San Diego Chargers in Week 7. During a Week 12 38–19 victory over the Arizona Cardinals in Week 12, Campbell recorded four solo tackles, made a season-high three pass deflections, and his first career interception off a pass attempt by Cardinals' quarterback Carson Palmer that was intended for tight end Jermaine Gresham to seal the victory in the fourth quarter. Campbell was inactive during the Falcons' Week 16 victory at the Carolina Panthers after suffering a concussion the previous week.

Campbell finished his rookie season with 48 combined tackles (35 solo), seven passes defensed, a forced fumble, and an interception in 11 games and 10 starts. The Falcons finished atop the NFC South with an 11–5 record in 2016 and earned a first round bye. On January 14, 2017, Campbell started his first career playoff game and recorded four combined tackles during a 36–20 victory over the Seattle Seahawks in the NFC Divisional Round. During the NFC Championship Game against the Green Bay Packers, he recorded two tackles as the Falcons won by a score of 44–22. On February 5, 2017, Campbell started in Super Bowl LI and recorded four total tackles as the Falcons were defeated 34–28 by the New England Patriots in overtime.

2017
On February 8, 2017, the Falcons fired defensive coordinator Richard Smith after they lost a 28–3 lead in the Super Bowl and allowed the Patriots to score 31 points in the second half of the game. Two days later, the Falcons announced their decision to promote secondary coach Marquand Manuel to defensive coordinator. Campbell entered training camp slated as the starting strongside linebacker after Vic Beasley was moved closer to an edge rushing defensive end role. Head coach Dan Quinn named Campbell the starting strongside linebacker to begin the regular season, alongside weakside linebacker Duke Riley and middle linebacker Deion Jones.

On September 17, 2017, Campbell recorded eight combined tackles, deflected a pass, and made his first NFL sack on Packers' quarterback Aaron Rodgers during a 34–23 victory over the Green Bay Packers. In Week 10, Campbell collected a season-high 13 combined tackles in a 27–7 victory against the Dallas Cowboys. Campbell started in all 16 games in 2017 and recorded 92 combined tackles (61 solo), four pass deflections, and two sacks.

2018
Campbell returned as the starting strongside linebacker to begin 2018, along with Duke Riley and Deion Jones. He played in 16 games with 13 starts, finishing with a team-leading 94 combined tackles, and 1.5 sacks.

2019
In Week 4 against the Tennessee Titans, Campbell recorded a team-high 17 tackles in the 24–10 loss. In Week 11 against the Carolina Panthers, Campbell recorded a team-high 11 tackles and intercepted a pass thrown by Kyle Allen in the 29–3 win. In Week 15 against the San Francisco 49ers, Campbell forced a fumble on running back Matt Breida which he recovered in the 29–22 win.

Arizona Cardinals

On April 3, 2020, Campbell signed a one–year contract with the Arizona Cardinals.

In Week 9 against the Miami Dolphins, Campbell recorded his first sack as a Cardinal on Tua Tagovailoa during the 34–31 loss. He finished the season starting all 16 games, recording 99 tackles (third on the team) and 2.0 sacks.

Green Bay Packers

2021
On June 9, 2021, Campbell signed with the Green Bay Packers. He was named the starting inside linebacker alongside Krys Barnes.

In a 35–17 win over the Detroit Lions in Week 2, Campbell notched an interception thrown by Lions quarterback Jared Goff. He caught his second interception on the season in a 25–22 overtime victory over the Cincinnati Bengals when he caught an errant pass thrown by Bengals quarterback Joe Burrow in the first play of the extra period.

Campbell won NFC Defensive Player of the Month award for his performances during month of October.

On January 14, 2022, Campbell was named a first-team member of the 2021 All-Pro Team, becoming the first Packers inside linebacker to achieve this honor since Ray Nitschke in 1966. He finished the season as PFF's second-highest graded linebacker, behind Micah Parsons of the Dallas Cowboys.

2022
On March 17, 2022, Campbell re-signed with the Packers on a five-year deal, worth $50 million. On October 23, 2022, during a Week 7 loss to the Washington Commanders, Campbell intercepted a pass from Taylor Heinicke and returned it 63 yards for his first NFL touchdown.

NFL career statistics

Regular season

Postseason

References

External links
Green Bay Packers bio
Minnesota Golden Gophers bio

1993 births
Living people
American football linebackers
Arizona Cardinals players
Atlanta Falcons players
Green Bay Packers players
Minnesota Golden Gophers football players
Players of American football from Florida
Sportspeople from Fort Myers, Florida
Ed Block Courage Award recipients